Morgan O'Connell (27 August 1811 – 2 July 1875) was an Irish Repeal Association politician who was Member of Parliament (MP) for Kerry from the 1835 election until the 1852 election. His father was John O'Connell, younger brother of Daniel O'Connell, the leader of the Repeal Association. John's son was usually called  Morgan John O'Connell to distinguish him from Daniel's son Morgan O'Connell, such a patronymic being a common Irish practice. His mother Elizabeth Coppinger was descended from Sir Walter Coppinger. He was "wild and extravagant" in his youth, and in middle age financial necessity made him practice at the English bar. His uncle William Coppinger died in 1862; O'Connell inherited an estate in County Cork directly and another in Kildysart, County Clare, after his mother died the next year. In 1865 he married Mary Anne Bianconi, daughter of entrepreneur Charles Bianconi; she remembered him as "a very handsome, tall, stout, jolly, fresh-looking man". Their only child, John O'Connell Bianconi, was a reforming landlord, and in 1914 the County Clare commander of the National Volunteers.

References

Sources

Citations

External links
 

1811 births
1875 deaths
Members of the Parliament of the United Kingdom for County Kerry constituencies (1801–1922)
UK MPs 1835–1837
UK MPs 1837–1841
UK MPs 1841–1847
UK MPs 1847–1852
Morgan John
Irish Repeal Association MPs
Irish landlords
Members of the Bar of England and Wales
Irish barristers
19th-century Irish landowners